The Hired Hand is a 1971 American western film directed by Peter Fonda, with a screenplay by Alan Sharp. The film stars Fonda, Warren Oates, and Verna Bloom. The cinematography was by Vilmos Zsigmond.   Bruce Langhorne provided the moody film score. The story is about a man returning to his abandoned wife after seven years of drifting from job to job throughout the Southwestern United States. The embittered woman will only let him stay if he agrees to move in as a hired hand.

Upon release, the film received a mixed critical response and was a financial failure. In 1973, the film was shown on NBC-TV in an expanded version, but soon drifted into obscurity. In 2001, a fully restored version was shown at various film festivals, gaining strong critical praise, and it was released by the Sundance Channel on DVD. It is now considered a classic Western of the period.

Plot
Harry Collings and Arch Harris are two saddle tramps who have grown weary after seven years of wandering through the American Southwest. Along with a younger companion, Dan Griffen, they stop off in Del Norte, a ramshackle town in the middle of nowhere run by the corrupt McVey. Harris and Griffen discuss traveling to California to look for work when Collings abruptly informs them he has decided to return to the wife he left years before. Griffen leaves the two in a bar and goes to buy supplies. Some town thugs shoot him to death out of pure meanness. Collings and Harris escape, but they return that night. Collings shoots McVey in the feet, crippling him.

After riding hundreds of miles back to his old house, Collings finds a cold welcome from his wife Hannah. In order to be allowed to stay, he offers his services simply as a "hired hand". Hannah agrees and quickly puts him to work. Gradually, the distrust and unease caused by years of estrangement slip away, and the two begin to become close again. For the first time, Collings feels willing to settle down, but Harris leaves, wanting "to see the ocean".

McVey and his troupe of hooligans interrupt his life. Learning that they have kidnapped Harris, Collings leaves Hannah again, this time to save his friend. In a brutal shootout with McVey's gang, all of the villains are killed and Collings is fatally wounded. Harris rides alone to Hannah's house.

Cast
Peter Fonda as Harry Collings
Warren Oates as Arch Harris
Verna Bloom as Hannah Collings
Robert Pratt as Dan Griffen
Severn Darden as McVey
Rita Rogers as Mexican Woman
Ann Doran as Mrs. Sorenson
Ted Markland as Luke
Owen Orr as Mace
Al Hopson as Bartender
Megan Denver as Janey Collings
Michael McClure as Plummer
Gray Johnson as Will
Larry Hagman as Sheriff (television version only)

Production
Due to the huge financial success of Easy Rider (1969), which Fonda co-wrote, produced and starred in, Universal Studios gave him full artistic control over The Hired Hand, his debut as a director. Universal also did the same for Dennis Hopper with The Last Movie that year, part of a larger project from the studio to give young filmmakers a $1,000,000 budget, and total creative control (Universal did the same for Douglas Trumbull, who made Silent Running, Monte Hellman for Two Lane Blacktop, and George Lucas, who created American Graffiti).

Hand was shot in New Mexico in the summer of 1970 with a budget of slightly less than $1,000,000. As he later discussed, Fonda was supported as a neophyte filmmaker by the cast of polished character actors, headed by Warren Oates. In addition, cinematographer Vilmos Zsigmond provided a high quality of naturalistic imagery. Zsigmond credited this film as his first major assignment in feature film: "... Before that ['The Hired Hand'], I basically did commercials. 'The Hired Hand' was probably the first time that I [as a cinematographer] actually had a dramatic story with good actors...." Fonda's selection of the then-unknown Bruce Langhorne as the film's musical composer was rewarded, as nearly all the film's reviews singled out the score as being unusually expressive and beautiful.

Frank Mazzola edited the film, using a series of complex and poetic montages, which featured elaborate dissolves, slow motion and overlapping still photography. Mazzola's opening montage was praised by several critics as the film's most memorable sequence.

Release
Fonda recalled "Universal was going to put up a billboard on Sunset Blvd., showing me without a shirt, wearing a cowboy hat and a pistol stuffed in my pants. The 
billboard was going to say something like, THAT EASY RIDER RIDES AGAIN!' I went to Universal and said you take that down or I'll take it down. I was prepared to take it down with explosives... They paid themselves a hefty fee upfront to distribute my film. I didn't see a pickass dime... At least I got them to take the billboard down."

Reception
The Hired Hand received generally mixed reviews, with some critics dismissing the film as a "hippie-western." Variety felt the film had "a disjointed story, a largely unsympathetic hero, and an obtrusive amount of cinematic gimmickry which renders inarticulate the confused story subtleties." Time described it as "pointless, virtually plotless, all but motionless and a lode of pap."  
But Roger Greenspun of The New York Times praised it as a "rather ambitious simple movie, with a fairly elaborate technique and levels of meaning rising to the mystical, which seems so much a part of the very contemporary old West." Jay Cocks wrote that the film was "a fine, elegiac western."

Despite Universal's hopes for another Easy Rider-sized youth hit, The Hired Hand was a commercial flop. It was sold to NBC-TV for subsequent television showings in 1973, when the majority of the film's fans first saw the movie. After that, it became difficult to see, rarely repeated on television and playing only occasionally at film festivals over the years.

In 2001, the film was fully restored and exhibited at a number of festivals to a generally enthusiastic critical response. Subsequently, the Sundance Channel released a DVD of the film in two separate editions that same year. The film is now well regarded as a minor western classic, with a 91% favorable rating on Rotten Tomatoes based on 11 reviews. Bill Kauffman has called it "a lovely meditation on friendship and responsibility, one of the least-known great movies of that richest of all cinematic eras, the early 1970s."  
Phil Hardy's The Aurum Film Encyclopedia: The Western opined the film was "beautifully photographed by Zsigmond...a superb evocation of the rigours and essential aimlessness of frontier life."

However, some critics found the film overrated. Glenn Erickson (aka "DVD Savant") believed the movie was "light in the story department and directed at a mannered crawl..."

Television version
When NBC-TV first aired The Hired Hand in 1973, they reinstated twenty minutes of footage that Fonda had deleted from the theatrical cut as "extraneous". Glenn Erickson has argued that the previously missing footage is very important to the film's narrative, noting that "writer Alan Sharp created a pressing reason for Oates' character to take his leave", and further opined that these twenty minutes helped make The Hired Hand more strongly resemble "a standard film with a story, events, dialogue and character interaction." The most substantial excision involved the death of Ed Plummer (Michael McClure), and the subsequent homicide investigation by the local sheriff (Larry Hagman). For the 2001 limited theatrical release, Fonda again removed the footage. All twenty minutes have been added to the DVD as an extra.

See also
 List of American films of 1971

References

External links

1971 Western (genre) films
1971 films
Films directed by Peter Fonda
Universal Pictures films
1971 directorial debut films
Films scored by Bruce Langhorne
1970s English-language films
American Western (genre) films
1970s American films